Xi'an District is a district of the city of Mudanjiang, Heilongjiang Province, China. Xi'an District is notable for its large Korean community, and is home to more than 24,000 Koreans.

Geography 
Xi'an District is located in the southwest of Mudanjiang's urban area, bound by Taiping Road in Dong'an District to the east, the county-level city of Ning'an to the south, the county-level city of Hailin to the west, and the Harbin–Suifenhe railway in Aimin District to the north.

The Hailang River flows through the district. Other major natural features in the district include Baoshan Lake, Heilong Mountain, and Jiangxin Island.

Administrative divisions 
Xi'an District administers six subdistricts, one town, and one ethnic township.

Subdistricts 

Towns 

Ethnic townships 
The district's sole township is Hainan Korean Ethnic Township.

Demographics 
The district has a population of approximately 249,000 people.

Xi'an District's population comprises 16 different ethnic minorities, and is home to a sizable Korean population, numbering around 24,500. About 12,000 Koreans live along the Korean Folk Culture Street neighborhood of the district.

Economy 
Taiping Road, which forms the eastern border of Xi'an District, is a major commercial center in Mudanjiang, hosting a number of major retail outlets, such as a Dashang Xinmate, Tiantian Department Store, and Guanghui Home Appliances.

Approximately 180 industrial enterprises are located in Xi'an District, many of which are located in the Hainan SME Park and the Wenchun Pharmaceutical Park, two major industrial parks in the district. Major industrial companies in the district include the Beichun Group, Futong Air Conditioning, and Xinxiang Petroleum.

Agriculture is also practiced throughout the district, which grows 113,700 mu of corn, 41,000 mu of rice, and 18,300 mu of other crops.

Culture 
The district is home to the Korean Folk Culture Street, a neighborhood predominantly along West Chang'an Street, bordered by West Shiyitiao Road to the west, and by West Santiao Road to the east. The neighborhood, which the People's Daily reports as having more than 400 Korean businesses, has Korean-run offices, Korean schools, Korean museums, and a number of Korean cultural groups. The district's government has promoted the use of Chinese-Korean bilingual signs in the area, and has installed Korean-inspired art pieces and decorations throughout the neighborhood.

In addition, the Zhongshan Korean Folk Culture Park.

Notes and references 

Xi'an
Mudanjiang